J. W. "Grassy" Hinton (June 30, 1907 – December 10, 1944) was a professional American football player who played quarterback for one season for the Staten Island Stapletons. Prior to his professional career, Hinton played college football at Texas Christian University. In 1930, he scored a touchdown inside Amon G. Carter Stadium against Arkansas. A member of the school's baseball team, Hinton was selected as the Horned Frogs' top outfielder for the 1932 season.

After the 1932 season, Hinton joined the United States Army Air Corps and became a pilot in 1934. When World War II began, he was a lieutenant colonel and training director at Fort Worth Army Air Field. In the Pacific theater, he flew a B-24 Liberator with the 372nd Bombardment Squadron at the time of his death in a crash on Halmahera Island on December 10, 1944. He is honored in the Football's Wartime Heroes display at the Pro Football Hall of Fame.

References

1907 births
1944 deaths
American football quarterbacks
Players of American football from Texas
TCU Horned Frogs football players
TCU Horned Frogs baseball players
Staten Island Stapletons players
United States Army Air Forces personnel killed in World War II
Aviators killed in aviation accidents or incidents
Missing in action of World War II
Aerial disappearances of military personnel in action
United States Army Air Forces colonels
United States Army Air Forces bomber pilots of World War II
Missing person cases in Indonesia
Victims of aviation accidents or incidents in 1944
Victims of aviation accidents or incidents in Indonesia